Wilderness is the third studio album by American rock band The Features, which was released on July 26, 2011 on label Bug Music/Serpents and Snakes.

Track listing

References

2011 albums
The Features albums